Eloria is a genus of moths in the subfamily Lymantriinae. The genus was erected by Francis Walker in 1855.

Species 
Eloria contains the following species:

 Eloria albifasciata Dognin 1923
 Eloria apicalis Walker, 1855
 Eloria aroensis Schaus 1906
 Eloria batesi Collenette 1950
 Eloria borealis Collenette 1950
 Eloria burityensis Collenette 1950
 Eloria captiosa Draudt 1927
 Eloria cavallo Collenette 1950
 Eloria charassomena Collenette 1950
 Eloria chares H. Druce 1893
 Eloria chorax H. Druce 1893
 Eloria cissusa H. Druce 1893
 Eloria clodia H. Druce 1893
 Eloria compulsa Draudt 1927
 Eloria copharpe Collenette 1950
 Eloria corvicoa Schaus 1927
 Eloria cubana Schaus 1906
 Eloria demortua Hübner 1825
 Eloria diaphana Stoll 1751
 Eloria discalis Walker, 1856
 Eloria discifera Walker, 1869
 Eloria ebba Schaus 1927
 Eloria edana Schaus 1927
 Eloria festiva Cramer 1775
 Eloria flavicollis Dognin 1924
 Eloria fumicosta Collenette 1950
 Eloria gigantea H. Druce 1895
 Eloria goyaz Collenette 1950
 Eloria grandis H. Druce 1899
 Eloria gueneei Collenette 1950
 Eloria hiulca Draudt 1927 - Valid Name
 Eloria hoplochares Collenette 1950
 Eloria insulsa Draudt 1927
 Eloria intacta Walker, 1855
 Eloria jocosa Dognin 1923
 Eloria limata Draudt 1927
 Eloria lucida Walker, 1856
 Eloria lyra Collenette 1950
 Eloria manesia Schaus 1927
 Eloria marginalis Walker, 1855
 Eloria melaphleba Collenette 1950
 Eloria melarrhoys Collenette 1950
 Eloria moeonia H. Druce 1899
 Eloria moeschleri Dognin 1923
 Eloria moesta Walker, 1856
 Eloria mossi Collenette 1950
 Eloria muzo Collenette 1950
 Eloria nigella Dognin 1923
 Eloria nimbosa Dognin 1923
 Eloria ninya Dognin 1923
 Eloria noyesi Schaus 1927
 Eloria ombrea H. Druce 1886
 Eloria onaba H. Druce 1886
 Eloria opaca Dognin 1923
 Eloria orosi Collenette 1950
 Eloria pellucida Hübner 1823
 Eloria pelocraspeda Collenette 1950
 Eloria peruviana Collenette 1950
 Eloria remota Walker, 1855
 Eloria roraima Collenette 1950
 Eloria rosenbergi Collenette 1950
 Eloria schausi Draudt 1927
 Eloria serena Schaus 1906
 Eloria sixola Schaus 1910
 Eloria spectra Hübner 1819-1826
 Eloria subapicalis Walker, 1863
 Eloria subnuda Walker, 1855
 Eloria teffe Collenette 1950
 Eloria torrida Schaus 1910
 Eloria ucayali Collenette 1950
 Eloria velhoa Schaus 1920
 Eloria venosa Walker, 1855
 Eloria walkeri Collenette 1950
 Eloria zoyga Collenette 1950

References

Lymantriinae
Moth genera
Taxa named by Jacob Hübner